Li Chen (born 24 November 1978), also known as Jerry Li, is a Chinese actor and director. He is a cast member and leader of the popular variety program, Keep Running. Li is also known for his roles in the television series Beijing Love Story (2012), Beijing Youth (2012) and The Good Fellas (2016); as well as films Ultimate Rescue (2008), which won him the China Movie Channel Media Awards and Aftershock (2010). Li made his directorial debut in 2017 with Sky Hunter.

Career
Li made his acting debut in the 1997 television series, Seventeen Year-Olds Don't Cry, and was remembered for his role as a young, energetic and pure boy. 
Li's career went quiet for several years, in which time he embarked on several unsuccessful business ventures and flirted with the idea of becoming a racing car driver. In 2002, under the recommendation of his mentor Lü Liping, Li got the role of Qi Beile in the palace romance drama 13th Princess and started to re-gain attention. Though the drama wasn't a huge success, Li got attention for his performance and was subsequently cast in several productions. In 2006, he rose to fame again for his performance in the 2006 drama Soldiers Sortie, and was signed onto Huayi Brothers. Li was then cast in the film Assembly (2007) by Feng Xiaogang.

In 2008, Li starred in the television film Ultimate Rescue where played a rough-edged taxi driver who is caught in the thick of a spontaneous rescue mission, and was widely praised for his realistic portrayal. Li was nominated at the International Emmy Awards for Best Actor, and won the Best Newcomer award at the China Movie Channel Media Awards. He continued his upward trajectory with several high profile films and television series including My Chief and My Regiment (2009) and Aftershock (2010); his performance in the latter resonated with the audience and earned him a nomination for Best Supporting Actor at the Hundred Flowers Awards.

Li then co-starred in the romantic drama Beijing Love Story (2012), which he also acts as producer. The series was popular during its run, recording 1 billion views and had a cult following online. The same year, he starred in Beijing Youth, the third installment of Zhao Baogang's Youth trilogy. The drama won positive reviews all-round for its realistic portrayal of youth. Li experienced a surge in popularity, and was named 'Artist of the Year' at the China TV Drama Awards.

In 2014, Li became a cast member of the variety program Keep Running, which had explosive popularity in China and launched Li into a household name.

Li then co-starred in war drama The Good Fellas, which he also acts as the creator cum executive producer. The series was filmed back in 2013, but only got its release in 2016. Li's efforts paid off, and The Good Fellas won the Best Television Series award at the Shanghai Television Festival.

In 2017, Li starred in the historical drama The Advisors Alliance, playing Cao Pi. The same year, he launched his directorial debut, Sky Hunter, which is China's first aerial warfare film.

In 2018, Li was cast in the action thriller drama Seven Days.

Personal life
On 16 September 2017, Li and actress Fan Bingbing were engaged after Li proposed to Fan at her birthday party. The couple announced their separation on 27 June 2019.

In 2021 January, Li opened a high-end bar in Sanya, China.

Filmography

Films

Television series

Variety show

Discography

Singles

Awards and nominations

Forbes China Celebrity 100

References

External links

 Li Chen on Sina Weibo
 

1978 births
Male actors from Beijing
Living people
Singers from Beijing
Chinese male film actors
Chinese male television actors
20th-century Chinese male actors
21st-century Chinese male actors
21st-century Chinese male singers